Walter M. Glasgow Jr. (born April 19, 1957) is an American sailor. He was born in Houston, Texas.
He won the 1975 Soling North American championship and finished 3rd in the 1975 Soling World Championship with John Kolius and Richard Hoepfner.
He won a silver medal in the Soling Class with John Kolius and Richard Hoepfner at the 1976 Summer Olympics in Kingston, Ontario, Canada. 
He finished 3rd in the 1979 5.5 m World Championship in Hanko, Norway with Albert Fay.
He won the 1981 J-24 World Championship at St. Francis Yacht Club in San Francisco, California with John Kolius.
He finished 2nd in the 1985 5.5 m U.S. Championship and 3rd in the 1985 5.5 m World Championship in Newport Beach, California with Robert Mosbacher.
In 1997, he won the 5.5 m Scandinavian Gold Cup and finished 5th in the 5.5 m World Championship in Hanko, Norway with Robert Mosbacher and Lawrence Daniel.

References

External links
 
 
 

1957 births
Living people
American male sailors (sport)
World champions in sailing for the United States
J/24 class world champions
Olympic silver medalists for the United States in sailing
Sailors at the 1976 Summer Olympics – Soling
Medalists at the 1976 Summer Olympics
20th-century American people
21st-century American people